Unwritten Law may refer to :

Films 
The Unwritten Law (1907 film), 1907 short film
Unwritten Law (1916 film) from California Motion Picture Studio
 The Unwritten Law (1922 film), 1922 German silent film directed by Carl Boese
 The Unwritten Law (1925 film), 1925 American silent crime melodrama directed by Edward LeSaint
 The Unwritten Law (1929 film), 1929 British short crime film directed by Sinclair Hill
 The Unwritten Law (1932 film), 1932 American mystery film directed by Christy Cabanne
 The Unwritten Law (1985 film), 1985 Hong Kong drama directed by Ng See-yuen

Legal 
An unspoken rule (type of Social norm)
An Oral law (type of Law)
Unwritten law (Ireland), landholding traditions in Ireland not recognized by law

Music 
Unwritten Law, a U.S. punk rock band that started in 1990
Unwritten Law (album), 1998 album by U.S. band Unwritten Law
"Unwritten Law", a song by The Sound from their 1980 album Jeopardy
"The Unwritten Law", a song by Deep Purple from their 1987 album The House of Blue Light

Other uses 
The Unwritten Law Caper, an episode of The Adventures of Sam Spade